This is a list of events from British radio in 1943.

Events

January
 6 January – BBC reporter Richard Dimbleby makes a live recording from a Royal Air Force nighttime bombing raid over Berlin piloted by Guy Gibson.

February
 12 February – The BBC Ottringham transmitting station in east Yorkshire goes live for broadcast of propaganda to Europe.

March
 March – A BBC radio adaptation of E. Nesbit's The Railway Children is broadcast.

April to August
 Spring – The BBC Monitoring service moves from Wood Norton Hall, Worcestershire, to Caversham Park and Crowsley Park, near Reading, Berkshire.

September
 4 September – BBC reporter Wynford Vaughan-Thomas reports from an RAF nighttime bombing raid over Berlin.

October
 17 October – The BBC Woofferton transmitting station in Shropshire begins shortwave broadcasts.

November
 14 November – Soldatensender Calais, a British black propaganda station begins broadcasting to German troops in Western Europe from a studio at Milton Bryan in Bedfordshire through the powerful medium wave Aspidistra transmitter in Sussex, purporting to be an official German military station.
 23 November – British Forces Broadcasting Service begins operation serving forces overseas.

December
 3 December – London-based American war reporter Edward R. Murrow delivers his classic "Orchestrated Hell" broadcast over CBS describing an RAF nighttime bombing raid over Berlin.

Debuts
 Caribbean Voices on the BBC World Service (1943–1958)

Continuing radio programmes

1930s
 In Town Tonight (1933–1960)

1940s
 Music While You Work (1940–1967)
 Sunday Half Hour (1940–2018)
 Desert Island Discs (1942–Present)

Births
 29 January – Tony Blackburn, DJ
 18 February – Graeme Garden, Scottish-born comedy performer 
 6 April – Roger Cook, Australasian-born investigative reporter
 17 August – John Humphrys, Welsh-born news broadcaster
 11 September – Brian Perkins, New Zealand-born newsreader
 28 September – Mike Dickin, DJ and presenter (died 2006)
 18 October – Dai Jones, Welsh broadcaster (died 2022)
 23 October – Roger Scott, DJ (died 1989)
 26 November – Paul Burnett, DJ

Deaths
 20 November – Rev. George Bramwell Evens ('Romany'), broadcaster and writer on countryside matters (born 1884)

See also 
 1943 in British music
 1943 in British television
 1943 in the United Kingdom
 List of British films of 1943

References 

 
Years in British radio
Radio